Events from the year 1731 in Denmark.

Incumbents
 Monarch – Christian VI
 Prime Minister – Iver Rosenkrantz

Events
 26 January – Kjøbenhavns Brandforsikring (Copenhagen Fire Insurance) is founded, speeding up the rebuilding of the city after the Copenhagen Fire of 1728 significantly since lending out money for construction projects becomes less risky.
 4 March – The Reformed Church in Copenhagen is reinaugurated after its rebuilding.
 8 April – Maglekilde Watermill is the first of a number of buildings which are destroyed in a series of devastating fires that hits Roskilde in 1731.
 6 June  The coronation of Christian VI of Denmark.
 7 October – The rebuilt Trinitatis Church is reinaugurated in Copenhagen.

Undated
 Nicolaus Zinzendorf visits Copenahgen and the Moravian Church gains considerable popularity
 Denmark-Norway introduces a new Royal Standard flag.

Births
 19 March – Niels Brock, merchant (died 1802)
 2 June – Dorothea Biehl, playwright, translator (died 1788)
 14 June – Johan Theodor Holmskjold, botanist, civil servant (died 1793)
 1 July – Johannes Wiedewelt, sculptor (died 1802)
 1 September – Ove Høegh-Guldberg, statesman, historian, and de facto prime minister of Denmark  (died 1808)

Full date missing
 Christian Hee Hwass, malacologist (died 1803)
 Anna Catharina Materna, actress (died 1757)
 Ingrid Maria Wenner, courtier  (died 1793)
 Marie Martine Bonfils, brewer

Deaths

References

 
1730s in Denmark
Denmark
Years of the 18th century in Denmark